Glue dots are pressure-sensitive adhesive dots, used in various different applications, such as sticking credit cards to paper, arts and crafts, and as a safe adhesive for children to use, without needing a hot glue gun. Glue dots are globules of adhesive, which allow attachments to float above a page.  They provide a clean and instant bond and are often a more suitable solution than hot or liquid glues or adhesive tapes. Glue dots leave much less mess, residue, and odor which help present a product in the best way, whilst increasing productivity and reducing costs. Removable glue dots also allow you to create a bond which can be removed when needed.

Types of glue dots 
Glue dots are supplied in different tack levels:

 High Tack Glue Dots: for removable or temporary fixing such as sticking credit cards to letterheads 
 Low Tack Glue Dots: still removable, but create much stronger adhesion for heavier items, such as sticking CDs to magazines. 
 High Shear Tack: semi-permanent glue dots with vertical hold ability that will create a strong bond between most surfaces 
 Super High Tack: permanent glue dots which will create a strong, permanent bond between most surfaces.

The strength of the bond is dependent on the materials being bonded. It is recommended to carry out adequate testing to determine the correct tack level needed.

Benefits 
Glue dots create bonds instantly, leave no mess, cause less waste, and avoid harmful burns which some people may experience when using a hot glue gun.

Uses of glue dots 
 Point of purchase display assembly
 Adhering matting in picture frames
 Sealing and resealing food & beverage cartons
 Building (gluing) pocket/presentation Folders
 Make a non-adhesive product, adhesive
 Assembling sample books
 Securing items prior to shrink wrapping
 Sign and display manufacturing
 Securing items within clamshells
 Joining sheeting, films, liners, papers, etc.
 Mounting lightweight trims, boards
 Scrapbooking
 Card making
 School crafts

Glue dot dispensers 
While glue dots can be applied manually in most cases, for commercial uses ease of application and productivity can be increased by using a glue dot dispenser. Using a dispenser also ensures that adhesive patterns are properly aligned upon application.

References

Adhesives